Eilat Light is a lighthouse in Eilat, Israel. The location is locally known as "the lighthouse beach", and is used for camping and snorkeling. It is close to the "University" diving location.

The site is open, though climbing the bluff might be difficult. The tower is closed to the public.

See also

 List of lighthouses in Israel

References

 Listed as "Elat".

Lighthouses in Israel
Eilat
Buildings and structures in Southern District (Israel)
Lighthouses of the Red Sea